Mechanical index (MI) is a unitless ultrasound metric. It is defined as 

where

Pr is the peak rarefaction pressure of the ultrasound wave (MPa), derated by an attenuation factor to account for in-tissue acoustic attenuation
fc is the center frequency of the ultrasound pulse (MHz).

MI is measured with a calibrated hydrophone in a tank of degassed water. The pulse pressure amplitudes are measured along the central axis of the ultrasound beam. The Pr is calculated by reducing it using an attenuation coefficient of 0.3 dB/cm/MHz.

MI is a unitless number that can be used as an index of cavitation bio-effects; a higher MI value indicates greater exposure. Levels below 0.3 are generally considered to have no detectable effects.  Currently the FDA stipulates that diagnostic ultrasound scanners cannot exceed a mechanical index of 1.9.

References

Acoustics
Ultrasound
Medical physics
Medical ultrasonography